is a Japanese manga series illustrated by Oh! great, based on the  Monogatari light novel series written by Nisio Isin. It was serialized in Kodansha's magazine Weekly Shōnen Magazine from March 2018 to March 2023, with its chapters collected and published in 21 tankōbon volumes as of March 2023. The story centers around the character of Koyomi Araragi, a senior high school student who was attacked by a vampire, while he meets other characters suffering from various paranormal illnesses and comes to their aid.

As of August 2020, Bakemonogatari had over 2.4 million copies in circulation.

Plot
The story revolves around Koyomi Araragi, a third-year high school student, now a quasi-vampire after surviving a vampire attack, with the help of Meme Oshino, a specialist in the supernatural. Despite having some superhuman abilities, such as regeneration, Koyomi tries his best to live life as a normal student, but keeps encountering girls with supernatural problems.

As Koyomi walks up the stairs, he notices a woman falling from the top of the staircase. He catches her, but notices that the woman, Hitagi Senjougahara has no weight to her. As natural, Koyomi find it unusual and realized something is wrong. Determined to help her, he goes to Tsubasa Hanekawa to learn more about Hitagi. However, after  attempting to confront her, she refuses his help and then proceeded to staple his mouth threatening him to not mess with her. Koyomi however not listening to her insists, and then runs after her to show that the wound she made in Koyomi’s mouth has fully healed. Convinced with this and realizing he has been involved with oddities, she accepts the help of Koyomi. Koyomi takes Hitagi to the same person that helped him, Oshino Meme. In the past, Hitagi Senjougahara’s mother was involved with a cult and brought a member of the cult to their house; whom the cult member attempted to sexually assault her as her mother did nothing to stop it, which she then hurt the man in self defense and as punishment, they took the mother away from the family. Oshino tells her that the curse is a crab, an oddity that cuts your weight. In Hitagi’s case, she had family affairs and had intentionally removes the guilt and burden of the issues, leading to being bitten by the crab oddity that stripped her of her weight. Oshino suggests they return back on midnight for the ritual After a while, Koyomi and Hitagi head to the cram school again. They see Oshino who has prepared the ritual and it starts immediately. The crab becomes visible and attacks Hitagi but she realizes to get rid of it, she must bear the weight of all the guilt of her family affairs. Gaining her normal weight back, she thanks Koyomi and befriends him.

Production
On January 10, 2018, Nisio Isin announced via Twitter that Bakemonogatari, from his Monogatari series, would receive a manga adaptation. On February 13, 2018, Kodansha revealed three pieces of character art and opened a contest for Twitter users to guess the identity of the artist who would illustrate the series. On February 28, 2018, it was announced that manga artist Oh! great would be illustrating the series.

In comments on the website Mantan Web, Oh! great explained his reasons for adding Kizumonogatari into the Bakemonogatari manga adaptation. He stated that for the Tsubasa Cat arc to work properly, he needed to adapt Kizumonogatari and Nekomonogatari, because in that way the readers would sympathize more for Hanekawa, and it would explain Senjougahara's position in the story thus far. He received Isin's permission to include Kizumonogatari in-between the arcs Nadeko Snake and Tsubasa Cat, but stated that he does not know if he will adapt Nekomonogatari yet, although he has an idea in mind if he does. He finished saying that his plan is to end the manga in the same way the novels ended with the high school festival.

Publication
Bakemonogatari is illustrated by Oh! great, based on the  Monogatari light novel series written by Nisio Isin. It was serialized in Kodansha's shōnen manga magazine Weekly Shōnen Magazine from March 14, 2018, to March 15, 2023. Kodansha has collected its chapters into individual tankōbon volumes. The first volume was released on June 15, 2018. The special edition of the first volume contained a short prose story by Nisio Isin and a short manga titled  by Oh! great. As of March 16, 2023, twenty-one volumes have been released.

In North America, Vertical announced the English release of the manga in March 2019. The first volume was released on October 1, 2019.

A preview video for the manga adaptation, produced by Shaft, was shown to visitors of the Oh! Great Exhibition from August 14–31, 2021 and then released on February 17, 2022, alongside the 16th volume of the manga.

Volume list

Reception
The first three volumes of the Bakemonogatari had over 1 million copies in circulation as of January 2019. The first nine volumes of Bakemonogatari had over 2.4 million copies in circulation as of August 2020, including digital versions.

Notes

References

External links
 
 

Anime and manga based on light novels
Kodansha manga
Monogatari (series)
Nisio Isin
Shōnen manga
Urban fantasy anime and manga
Vampires in anime and manga
Vertical (publisher) titles
Works published under a pseudonym

ja:化物語#漫画版